or  is a lake that lies in Fauske Municipality in Nordland county, Norway. The water from the lake flows west into the neighboring lake Låmivatnet. The ending -jávrre is the Lule Sami word for "lake".

See also
 List of lakes in Norway
 Geography of Norway

References

Lakes of Nordland
Fauske